Sacred Way typically refers to 

 Sacred Way, the ancient road from Athens to Eleusis

Sacred way typically refers to

 Sacred way (shendao), the ornate road leading to a Chinese tomb of a major dignitary

Sacred Way or ways may also refer to:

 Sacred Way, the ancient road connecting the monumental sites at Delphi
 Sacred Way, the ancient road connecting the city of Samos to the Heraion of Samos
 Sacred Way, an ancient road connecting the Sanctuary of Didyma to the city
 Sacred Way, the road leading to the asclepium of ancient Pergamon
 Sacred Way (Via Sacra), the road leading to the Capitoline Hill of ancient Rome
 Sacred Way (Shendao), the sacred way connecting Ming Xiaoling to Nanjing
 Sacred Way (Voie Sacrée), a road that connects Bar-le-Duc to Verdun, France